Michael Walter Fitzgerald (born July 11, 1959) is a United States district judge of the United States District Court for the Central District of California.

Early life and education 
Fitzgerald was born in Los Angeles, California, on July 11, 1959. He earned an Artium Baccalaureus from Harvard College in 1981 and a Juris Doctor from the University of California, Berkeley School of Law in 1985. From 1985 to 1986, Fitzgerald served as a law clerk for Judge Irving Kaufman of the United States Court of Appeals for the Second Circuit.

Professional career 
From 1988 until 1991, Fitzgerald was an Assistant United States Attorney for the Central District of California. Fitzgerald worked at Heller, Ehrman, White & McAuliffe from 1991 to 1995 and at the Law Offices of Robert L. Corbin from 1995 to 1998. From 1998, until his appointment to the Federal bench, Fitzgerald was part of a small Los Angeles law firm, Corbin, Fitzgerald & Athey, which handles white collar criminal defense and business litigation.

Federal judicial service 
On July 20, 2011, President Obama nominated Fitzgerald to the judicial seat on the United States District Court for the Central District of California vacated by Howard Matz. Fitzgerald is the fourth openly gay candidate nominated by Obama to a federal judgeship, after Edward DuMont, J. Paul Oetken, and Alison J. Nathan. 

He received a hearing before the Senate Judiciary Committee on October 4, 2011, and the committee reported his nomination to the floor of the Senate on November 3, 2011, his nomination being placed on the Senate Executive Calendar that same day. On March 15, 2012, the Senate confirmed Fitzgerald by a 91–6 vote. He received his commission the same day.

In February 2018, Fitzgerald's ruling in Sean Hall and Nathan Butler's  copyright lawsuit against Taylor Swift received international attention.

Personal
Fitzgerald is openly gay and was the first openly LGBT person to be appointed to the federal bench in California.

See also 
 List of LGBT jurists in the United States

References

External links

1959 births
Living people
Assistant United States Attorneys
Harvard College alumni
Judges of the United States District Court for the Central District of California
LGBT appointed officials in the United States
LGBT judges
LGBT lawyers
Lawyers from Los Angeles
UC Berkeley School of Law alumni
United States district court judges appointed by Barack Obama
21st-century American judges